Alaska Route 2 is a state highway in the central and east-central portions of the U.S. state of Alaska. It runs from Manley Hot Springs to the Canada-United States border, passing through Fairbanks and Delta Junction. Alaska Route 2 includes the entire length of the Alaska Highway in the state, the remainder of the highway being in the Yukon Territory and British Columbia, Canada.

Route description
Route 2 begins at a dead end near the Tanana River at Manley Hot Springs, where the Elliott Highway begins. Until the junction with the Dalton Highway (Alaska Route 11) at Livengood, Route 2 is a minor road used only for local access; beyond Livengood it carries traffic to and from the Dalton Highway. At the junction with Alaska Route 6 (Steese Highway) at Fox, the Elliott Highway ends and Route 2 follows the Steese Highway south into Fairbanks. The Steese Highway becomes the Richardson Highway at Airport Way, the former route of the Parks Highway (Alaska Route 3). The Parks Highway junction is now about a mile south along the Richardson Highway, which then leaves Fairbanks to the southeast. In Delta Junction, at the northwest end of the Alaska Highway, Route 2 leaves the Richardson Highway for the Alaska Highway, while the Richardson Highway continues south as Alaska Route 4. After passing the ends of the Tok Cut-Off Highway (Alaska Route 1) at Tok and the Taylor Highway (Alaska Route 5) just beyond, Route 2 becomes Yukon Highway 1 at the Canada–US border.

History

Proposed U.S. Route 97 designation

The Alaska Highway portion of Route 2 was once proposed to be part of the U.S. Highway System, to be signed as part of U.S. Route 97. This proposal was initiated after British Columbia renumbered a series of highways to British Columbia Highway 97 between the U.S. border at U.S. 97's northern terminus south of Osoyoos, and the border with the Yukon territory south of Watson Lake. The proposal was withdrawn after the Yukon declined to also renumber its portion of the Alaska Highway to '97', which would have then formed a continuous '97' designation from contiguous U.S. and through Canada to Alaska.

Major intersections

Future
A  road reaching Nome in western Alaska has been proposed at various times. Such a road had been suggested as early as 1957 as an extension of U.S. Route 97. From 2009 onward, there has been a more intense political debate. A detailed cost investigation was funded by the state government, which in 2010 gave an estimated cost of $2.3 to $2.7 billion, or approximately $5 million per mile. This price tag was higher than previously assumed and caused hesitation about the project. A  extension to Tanana opened in September 2016, although it has been defined as a local road, not Route 2, allowing a cost reduced more simple road. , no decisions have been made to start construction of additional sections.

References

Expressways in the United States
Interstate Highways in Alaska
Transportation in Fairbanks North Star Borough, Alaska
Transportation in Unorganized Borough, Alaska
02
U.S. Highways in Alaska